Moulton College is a further education college based in Moulton, Northamptonshire, England.  Although initially established as the Northamptonshire Institute of Agriculture in 1921, it now has expanded its teaching curriculum to cover a wide range of land-based subjects, sports, and construction. Moulton College operates a number of satellite campuses in Northamptonshire, including ones in Daventry, Silverstone and Higham Ferrers.

Moulton College teaches at all levels on the QCF framework from entry level through to doctorate level, with all BSc and MSc higher education degrees accredited with Northampton University.  Academic staff at the college conduct applied research in their field of study. The college funds a number of associate lecturer posts who conduct PhD studies concurrently with teaching on undergraduate courses. The College is also a lead academic sponsor of Daventry University Technical College which is due to open in September 2013.

History
Moulton College was established in 1921 as the Northamptonshire Institute of Agriculture. See also the brief history section below.

Subject areas on taught courses

Further Education
Agriculture
Animal welfare & management
Arboriculture
Bricklaying
Building maintenance operations
Carpentry and joinery
Construction management
Countryside management
Equine studies
Floristry
Furniture studies
General education
Horticulture
Housing practice and maintenance
Plumbing, heating and renewable technologies
Sport studies
Stonemasonry
Wall and floor tiling

Higher Education
Agriculture
Animal Studies
Arboriculture
Construction services
Equine studies
Horticulture
Interior design
Sports studies
Teacher training
Zoology

References

External links

 

Further education colleges in Northamptonshire
Learning and Skills Beacons
Agricultural universities and colleges in the United Kingdom
Educational institutions established in 1921
1921 establishments in England
Education in West Northamptonshire District